Battle of Mount Hermon may refer to:

First Battle of Mount Hermon, fought on October 6, 1973
Second Battle of Mount Hermon, fought on October 8, 1973
Third Battle of Mount Hermon (Operation Dessert), fought on October 21–22, 1973